The athletics competition at the 2017 European Youth Summer Olympic Festival was held at the Radnóti street Sport Centre in Győr, Hungary between 25 July and 29 July. A total of 36 events were contested, evenly divided between the sexes, repeating the programme of the previous edition.

Medal summary

Boys

Girls

Medal table

References

Results
Results

2017 European Youth Summer Olympic Festival
European Youth Summer Olympic Festival
2017
International athletics competitions hosted by Hungary